Borya is a tiny crater on the Moon. It is near the site where Soviet lunar rover Lunokhod 1 landed in November 1970, in the Mare Imbrium region. The name Borya does not refer to a specific person; it is a male name of Russian origin, the diminutive form of Boris.

References

External links

Borya at The Moon Wiki
 
 

Impact craters on the Moon
Mare Imbrium